William Tully may refer to:
 William Tully (diver), Australian diver
 William J. Tully, American lawyer and politician from New York
 William Alcock Tully, Surveyor General of Queensland
 William Tully, protagonist of the 1919 novel William – an Englishman